Synaptocochlea picta, common name the painted false stomatella, is a species of sea snail, a marine gastropod mollusk in the family Trochidae, the top snails.

Distribution
This species occurs in the Caribbean Sea, the Gulf of Mexico and the Lesser Antilles.

Description 
The maximum recorded shell length is 7 mm.

The imperforate, oblong, blackish shell is ear-shaped. The small spire is transversely lirate with the larger and smaller lirae alternating. It is obsoletely articulated with white. The oblong aperture is very oblique and greenish white within. The black margin is crenulate. The inner lip is rather flattened. There is a narrow lunar umbilical rimation. The thin operculum is orbicular and multispiral.

Habitat 
The minimum recorded depth for this species is 0 m; the maximum recorded depth is 713 m.

References

 Adams, A. 1850. An arrangement of Stomatellidae, including the characters of a new genus, and of several new species. Proceedings of the Zoological Society of London 18: 29–40.
 Adams, H. and A. Adams. 1864. Descriptions of new species of shells, chiefly from the Cumingian collection. Proceedings of the Zoological Society of London 31: 428–435.
 Rehder, H. A. 1939. New marine mollusks from the Western Atlantic. Nautilus 53: 16–21, pl. 6
 Usticke, G. W. Nowell. 1959. A Check List of Marine Shells of St. Croix.  vi + 90, 4 pls. Author: Christiansted, St. Croix
 Rosenberg, G., F. Moretzsohn, and E. F. García. 2009. Gastropoda (Mollusca) of the Gulf of Mexico, Pp. 579–699 in Felder, D.L. and D.K. Camp (eds.), Gulf of Mexico–Origins, Waters, and Biota. Biodiversity. Texas A&M Press, College Station, Texas

External links
 

picta
Gastropods described in 1847